Duncan Manor is a historic house located in rural McLean County, Illinois, near Towanda. The house was built circa 1866 for William R. Duncan, a livestock breeder well respected for his short-horned cattle. The Italianate house features two three-story towers on its northwest facade; the towers feature bracketed cornices on their pyramidal roofs. The main entrance is located between the towers. The southeast side of the house features -story towers topped with ornamental bracketed pediments. The towers flank a two-story entrance porch topped by additional bracketing.

The house was added to the National Register of Historic Places on February 9, 1979.

Notes

External links

www.duncanmanorhouse.com
www.facebook.com/duncanmanorillinois
Duncan Manor - Village of Towanda
Duncan Manor Information Site

Houses in McLean County, Illinois
National Register of Historic Places in McLean County, Illinois
Houses on the National Register of Historic Places in Illinois